Marta Fraga and Adriana González-Peñas were the defending champions, but did not compete in the Juniors that year.

Kateřina Böhmová and Michaëlla Krajicek won the title, defeating Irina Kotkina and Yaroslava Shvedova in the final, 6–3, 6–2.

Seeds

Draw

Finals

Top half

Bottom half

References

Girls' Doubles
French Open, 2004 Girls' Doubles